"Balikoowa" is an ethno folk song by Ugandan music duo Undercover Brothers Ug. It was released on 20 February 2017 as the Original Sound Track and Theme Song for the Ugandan Situation Comedy Balikoowa in the City.

Background
Balikoowa was written by Jay K Mulungi and Timothy Kirya as the title theme song for Balikoowa in the City, a Ugandan drama series in which Jay K Mulungi makes a cameo appearance. The song tells a story of a man named Balikoowa. The lyrics of the song portray Balikoowa's first time in the city, how he could not fit in. He sees many vehicles and he was almost knocked by a speeding motor bike. Balikoowa is so primitive and he has to face the city.

Reception
Balikoowa received favourable reception mostly around the Buganda area because of its traditional kiganda sound. It has been played at parties and clubs with audiences getting to their feet to dance the traditional kiganda dance. This song has always closed the duos repertoires since its release. The fans even created their own videos of the song while The Undercover Brothers haven't release a video for it.

Track listing and formats
Digital download
 "Balikoowa" – 3:24

References

Ugandan songs
World music songs
2017 singles
Television soundtracks
2017 songs